The 2015–16 Oman Professional League (known as the Omantel Professional League for sponsorship reasons) is the 40th edition of the top football league in Oman. The season began on 13 September 2015 and conclude on 14 April 2016. The start of the 2015–16 Professional League season which was scheduled for 19 August 2015 was later postponed to 13 September 2015 following requests from five of the 14 participating clubs (Al-Oruba, Fanja, Al-Nahda, Saham and Sur). Al-Oruba SC are the defending champions, having won their fourth title in the previous 2014–15 Oman Professional League season. At the end of the 25th round, Oman Football Association announced that if the top two teams at the end of the last round end up with equal points, the two teams will play a home and away championship play-off on 28 April 2016 and 2 May 2016 at the respective home grounds.

The curtains came down on a thrilling OPL season with Fanja SC outplaying Al-Suwaiq SC for a 2-0 victory and a record-equalling ninth domestic league crown on Sunday, 24 April 2016.

Teams
This season the league had 14 teams. Bowsher Club and Al-Seeb Club were relegated to the Oman First Division League after finishing in the relegation zone in the 2014–15 Oman Professional League season. Sohar SC however again managed to play in the top division as they won the Relegation/Promotion playoff against Al-Rustaq SC who had finished third in the 2014–15 Oman First Division League to earn the Relegation/Promotion playoff spot. The two relegated teams were replaced by Oman First Division League winners Muscat Club and runners-up Salalah SC.

Stadiums and locations

''Note: Table lists clubs in alphabetical order.

Personnel and kits

Note: Flags indicate national team as has been defined under FIFA eligibility rules. Players may hold more than one non-FIFA nationality.

Managerial changes

Foreign players
Restricting the number of foreign players strictly to four per team, including a slot for a player from AFC countries. A team could use four foreign players on the field during each game including at least one player from the AFC country.

League table

Results

Clubs season-progress

Promotion/relegation play-off

1st leg

2nd leg

Ja'lan earned promotion to 2016–17 Oman Professional League after winning 3-2 on aggregate.

Season statistics

Top scorers

Top Omani Scorers

Hat-tricks

* Player scored 4 goals

OFA Awards
Oman Football Association awarded the following awards for the 2015–16 Oman Professional League season.
Top Scorer: Vedran Gerc (Sohar)
Best Player: Mohammed Al-Musalami (Fanja)
Best Goalkeeper: Riyadh Al-Alawi (Al-Oruba)
Best Coach: Abderrazak Khairi (Al-Suwaiq)
Best Team Manager: Hamdan Bait Said (Salalah)
Fair Play Award: Fanja SC

Media coverage

Controversies
The league was the subject of controversies like the refusal of 2014–15 Oman Professional League and 2014–15 Sultan Qaboos Cup to play in the 2015 Oman Super Cup.

On 19 August 2015, the defending Oman Professional League and Sultan Qaboos Cup champions, Al-Oruba SC decided to pull out of the 2015 Oman Super Cup citing non-payment of dues by the Oman Football Association and a late release of its players from national and army team camps as the main reasons behind the club's decision to pull out. On 21 August 2015, Fanja was declared the winner of the Super Cup after its opponent, Al-Oruba, as expected failed to turn up for the match. On 6 September 2015, the defending champions were punished by the OFA's disciplinary committee for failing to turn up against Fanja in the 2015 Oman Super Cup. The defending champions of both the Oman Professional League and the Sultan Qaboos Cup were fined a sum of Omani Rial 500 and the committee decided that the club will play their first five 2015–16 Oman Professional League fixtures away from home.

See also

2015–16 Sultan Qaboos Cup
2015–16 Oman Professional League Cup
2015 Oman Super Cup
2015–16 Oman First Division League
2015–16 Oman Second Division League

References

External links
Season at soccerway.com

Top level Omani football league seasons
2015–16 in Omani football
Oman